Cullingworth railway station was a station on the Queensbury Lines which ran between Keighley, Bradford and Halifax. The station served the village of Cullingworth, West Yorkshire, England. It opened for passengers in 1884 and closed in May 1955. Goods traffic continued until 1963, when the surviving line closed completely.

References

External links
 Cullingworth station on navigable 1947 O. S. map

Disused railway stations in Bradford
Former Great Northern Railway stations
Railway stations in Great Britain opened in 1884
Railway stations in Great Britain closed in 1955
1884 establishments in England
1955 disestablishments in England